Kapucínska Street (Capuchin Street) is a street in Bratislava in the historical center of the Old Town. It is located next to the Župní náměstí (County square) and through its center there is a tram line leading to the overpass above Staromestská direction below Hradní vrch towards the boroughs of Karlova Ves and Dúbravka.

In 2006, it underwent a complete refurbishment of the surface, and an old well was discovered nearby and was reconstructed on this occasion. On Kapucínska there is an old Capuchin church  and a municipal library.

Gallery

References

External links 

 

Streets in Bratislava
Odonyms referring to religion
Old Town, Bratislava